Gaertnera is a genus of flowering plants in the family Rubiaceae. There are at least 85 species distributed across the Old World tropics from Africa to Asia.

Plants in this genus are variable in appearance and biology. Most all are regional endemics, plants limited to a small geographical area and narrowly adapted to local conditions. Most grow in moist forest habitat.

These are generally woody plants with clusters of white, pink, or red flowers and purple-black fruits. Some species are distylous, with plants having one of two flower morphs. Other species are dioecious, with plants having either male or female flowers. Dioecious species are generally found in Southeast Asia.

Species
, Plants of the World Online accepted the following species:

Gaertnera alata Bremek. ex Malcomber & A.P.Davis
Gaertnera alstonii Malcomber
Gaertnera aphanodioica Malcomber
Gaertnera arenaria Baker
Gaertnera arenarioides C.M.Taylor
Gaertnera aurea Malcomber
Gaertnera bambusifolia Malcomber & A.P.Davis
Gaertnera belumutensis Malcomber
Gaertnera bieleri (De Wild.) E.M.A.Petit
Gaertnera breviflora C.M.Taylor
Gaertnera brevipedicellata Malcomber & A.P.Davis
Gaertnera calycina Bojer
Gaertnera capitulata Malcomber
Gaertnera cardiocarpa Boivin ex Baill.
Gaertnera cooperi Hutch. & M.B.Moss
Gaertnera crassiflora Bojer
Gaertnera cuneifolia Bojer
Gaertnera darcyana Malcomber & A.P.Davis
Gaertnera divaricata (Thwaites) Thwaites
Gaertnera diversifolia Ridl.
Gaertnera drakeana Aug.DC.
Gaertnera edentata Bojer
Gaertnera eketensis Wernham
Gaertnera fractiflexa Beusekom
Gaertnera furcellata (Baill. ex Vatke) Malcomber & A.P.Davis
Gaertnera gabonensis Malcomber
Gaertnera × gardneri Thwaites
Gaertnera globigera Beusekom
Gaertnera grisea Hook.f. ex C.B.Clarke
Gaertnera guillotii Hochr.
Gaertnera hirsuta C.M.Taylor
Gaertnera hirtiflora Verdc.
Gaertnera hispida Aug.DC.
Gaertnera humblotii Drake
Gaertnera ianthina Malcomber
Gaertnera inflexa Boivin ex Baill.
Gaertnera junghuhniana Miq.
Gaertnera kochummenii Malcomber
Gaertnera laevis C.M.Taylor
Gaertnera letouzeyi Malcomber
Gaertnera leucothyrsa (K.Krause) E.M.A.Petit
Gaertnera liberiensis E.M.A.Petit
Gaertnera littoralis C.M.Taylor
Gaertnera longifolia Bojer
Gaertnera longivaginalis (Schweinf. ex Hiern) E.M.A.Petit
Gaertnera lowryi Malcomber
Gaertnera luteocarpa Jongkind
Gaertnera macrobotrys Baker
Gaertnera macrostipula Baker
Gaertnera madagascariensis (Hook.f.) Malcomber & A.P.Davis
Gaertnera malcomberiana C.M.Taylor
Gaertnera masoalana C.M.Taylor
Gaertnera microphylla Capuron ex Malcomber & A.P.Davis
Gaertnera monstruosa Malcomber
Gaertnera monticola Jongkind
Gaertnera nitida C.M.Taylor
Gaertnera obesa Hook.f. ex C.B.Clarke
Gaertnera oblanceolata King & Gamble
Gaertnera obovata Baker
Gaertnera paniculata Benth.
Gaertnera pauciflora Malcomber & A.P.Davis
Gaertnera pedunculata Jongkind
Gaertnera pendula Bojer
Gaertnera phanerophlebia Baker
Gaertnera phyllosepala Baker
Gaertnera phyllostachya Baker
Gaertnera psychotrioides (DC.) Baker
Gaertnera rakotovaoana C.M.Taylor
Gaertnera ramosa Ridl.
Gaertnera raphaelii Malcomber
Gaertnera razakamalalana C.M.Taylor
Gaertnera robusta C.M.Taylor
Gaertnera rosea Thwaites ex Benth.
Gaertnera rotundifolia Bojer
Gaertnera rubra C.M.Taylor
Gaertnera schatzii Malcomber
Gaertnera schizocalyx Bremek.
Gaertnera sclerophylla C.M.Taylor
Gaertnera spicata K.Schum.
Gaertnera sralensis (Pierre ex Pit.) Kerr
Gaertnera stictophylla (Hiern) E.M.A.Petit
Gaertnera ternifolia Thwaites
Gaertnera trachystyla (Hiern) E.M.A.Petit
Gaertnera vaginans (DC.) Merr.
Gaertnera vaginata Poir.
Gaertnera velutina C.M.Taylor
Gaertnera vernicosa C.M.Taylor
Gaertnera viminea Hook.f. ex C.B.Clarke
Gaertnera walkeri (Arn.) Blume
Gaertnera xerophila C.M.Taylor

References

 
Rubiaceae genera
Taxonomy articles created by Polbot